Chesapeake & Ohio Railway 2755 is a standard gauge steam railway locomotive of the 2-8-4 type, called "Berkshire" by most US railroads, but "Kanawha" by the Chesapeake & Ohio (C&O). It is one of a total of ninety built by 
ALCO (which built seventy) and Lima (which built the remaining twenty, including 2755) between 1943 and 1947.

A Berkshire type was the first of the Lima Super Power locomotives in 1925 and these followed in that tradition, with all the latest equipment -- Schmidt superheater, Elesco feedwater heater, booster on the trailing truck, roller bearings, and so forth. They carried Baker valve gear, which the C&O preferred to the simpler and much more widely used Walschaerts valve gear.

It spent its nine-year working life hauling coal on the various mine branches out of Logan, West Virginia, usually to the Ohio River at Russell, Kentucky. Its last known run was from Handley, West Virginia, to Russell on January 18, 1956.

After refurbishing at the Huntington, West Virginia, shops in the fall of 1960, it was delivered to its present location in Chief Logan State Park in March 1961.  It was seriously vandalized in the late 1970s or early 1980s, with the glass broken and gauges stolen or destroyed. It has been repaired and fenced for protection. The Island Creek Model Railroad Club acts as curators.

The locomotive was added to the National Register of Historic Places in 2006 as Chesapeake and Ohio 2755 Steam Locomotive.

References

2-8-4 locomotives
2755
Individual locomotives of the United States
Lima locomotives
Logan County, West Virginia
National Register of Historic Places in Logan County, West Virginia
Railway locomotives introduced in 1947
Railway locomotives on the National Register of Historic Places
Standard gauge locomotives of the United States
Rail transportation on the National Register of Historic Places in West Virginia
Preserved steam locomotives of West Virginia